The 2008–09 Toto Cup Leumit was the twenty-seventh season of the third most important football tournament in Israel since its introduction and fifth under the current format. It was held in two stages. First, twelve Liga Leumit teams were divided into two groups. Four teams from each group advanced to the Quarterfinals. Quarterfinals held as two-legged matches, while the Semifinals and the Final was held as one-legged matches.

The defending champions were Hapoel Petah Tikva.

On 3 February 2009, Hapoel Be'er Sheva won the 2008–09 Toto Cup Leumit making it their first Toto Cup title.

Group stage
The matches were played from August 8 to November 18, 2008.

Group A

Group B

Elimination rounds

Quarterfinals
The first legs were played from November 24 to December 11, 2008 while the second legs were played on January 5 to 13, 2009.

Semifinals

Final

See also
 2008–09 Liga Leumit
 2008–09 Israel State Cup

External links
 Official website 

Leumit
Toto Cup Leumit
Israel